Adaílton da Silva Santos (born 26 December 1979 in Salvador Bahia), best known as Adaílton, is a Brazilian footballer.

His career started in 2000 when he played for Barreiras. He then played for Criciúma Esporte Clube and in France with AS Nancy-Lorraine, winner of the Coupe de la Ligue in 2006.

Adailton retired from professional football because of a serious leg injury according to Ligue 1 club Nancy on 18 October 2008.

References

External links
 

1979 births
Living people
Brazilian footballers
Brazilian expatriate footballers
Expatriate footballers in France
Criciúma Esporte Clube players
AS Nancy Lorraine players
Ligue 1 players
Association football defenders